Şükran is a Turkish given name. Notable people with the name include:
 Şükran Albayrak (born 1982), Turkish TV presenter and former female basketball player 
 Şükran Moral (born 1962), Turkish female artist

Turkish feminine given names